Aralia racemosa, with common names American spikenard, small spikenard, Indian root, spice berry, spignet, life-of-man, petty morel, is an ornamental plant in the family Araliaceae native to the United States and Canada. Its native range includes most of the eastern United States.

References

External links
Aralia racemosa
Connecticut Botanical Society: Aralia racemosa 

racemosa
Flora of Ontario
Flora of North America
Garden plants of North America
Plants described in 1753
Taxa named by Carl Linnaeus
Flora without expected TNC conservation status